Chandamama (Telugu: చందమామ, English translation: Moon) is a 2007 Telugu film directed by Krishna Vamsi starring Navdeep and Kajal Aggarwal alongside Siva Balaji, Sindhu Menon,  and Nagababu. The movie is produced by C. Kalyan and S. Vijayanand, the musical score is provided by K. M. Radha Krishnan and the base story by Akula Venkat. Popular actress Charmme Kaur gave her voice to Kajal Aggarwal. The film  has garnered the five Nandi Awards and received highly positive reviews. The film was remade under the name A Aa E Ee in Tamil by AVM Productions. Adivi Sesh missed the opportunity to play Navdeep's Character.

Plot
Ranga Rao: a widower, landlord, and well-respected man, loves his beloved daughter Mahalakshmi: a sweet, intelligent, innocent, and somewhat fun-loving girl who loves her father as much as he loves her, more than anything else. His brother also has a daughter Rani and a son. Rani is like a sister to Mahalakshmi and a second daughter to Ranga Rao. Rani is a hyper, whiny, talkative but fun-loving, sweet girl. When Mahalakshmi returns from college, Ranga Rao realizes that she has grown up and decides to fix her marriage with Dhorababu, an innocent, good-natured, and rather shy boy.

After the engagement, Mahalakshmi reveals to Dhorababu that in the city, she had fallen in love with Kishore, a mischievous, witty, and amiable youth. After spending the night with her, Kishore made it clear that he was not interested in marrying her. Mahalakshmi says that she did not want to lie and cheat Dhorababu, because she knows he is good and deserves better. Dhorababu goes to meet and confront Kishore, where he learns it was all a prank and that Kishore actually loves Mahalakshmi. He fakes an accident and brings Kishore to the village under the pretense of a doctor. Mahalakshmi forgives Kishore. Finding out the secret, Rani falls in love with Dhorababu and vice versa. They dare not tell anyone, however.

Ranga Rao misunderstands their feelings and fixes Rani's marriage with Kishore, to take place at the same time as Mahalakshmi's with Dhorababu. The four youngsters decide the only way left is to elope, though Mahalakshmi has mixed feelings about this, as she feels it would hurt her father. At the last minute, Mahalakshmi cannot go through with it and tearfully confesses the truth to her father. Luckily, Ranga Rao understands and has the girls marry their respective lovers.

Cast

 Navdeep as Kishore
 Kajal Aggarwal as Mahalakshmi (Voice by Charmy Kaur)
 Siva Balaji as Dhorababu
 Sindhu Menon as Rani
 Nagababu as Ranga Rao
 Satyam Rajesh as Rani's brother
 Ahuti Prasad as Ramalingeswara Rao
 Uttej as Kondala Rao
 Abhinayashree as Sakkubai
 Jeeva as Police Inspector
 Gundu Sudarshan as Police Constable
 Sameer

Soundtrack

Music of Chandamama was launched on 20 August 2007 in a live telecasting of a private TV channel. This launch was attended by the cast and crewmembers of the film. K. M. Radha Krishnan composed the music. Krishna Vamsi released the audio and handed over the first cassette to producer C Kalyan. Supreme Music bought the audio rights.

Remakes

Box office
The film was highly successful at the box office and completed a 100-day run on 18 December 2007.

Satellite Rights
The satellite rights of the film was sold to Zee Telugu.

Awards
Nandi Awards
 Best Home - Viewing Feature Film - C. Kalyan
 Best Director - Krishna Vamsi
 Best Character Actor - Ahuti Prasad
 Best Art Director - Srinivasa Raju
 Best Male Comedian - Uttej

References

External links
 
 Snippet on Nonstop Cinema
  Preview on Indiaglitz
 Review on Idlebrain

2000s Telugu-language films
2007 films
Telugu films remade in other languages
Films directed by Krishna Vamsi
Indian drama films